The Coppa Italia Dilettanti (Italian for: Italian Amateurs Cup) is an annual knock-out competition for teams from the fifth and sixth levels of Italian football: the Eccellenza and the Promozione. All ties except for the final, which is held at the Stadio Flaminio in Rome, are played on a home-and-away basis. The cup-winners are also awarded promotion to Serie D, the fourth-ranked league.

Prior to the 1999–2000 season the competition also included teams from Serie D. There were then two parallel knockout competitions, one for Serie D teams and one for teams from the Eccellenza and Promozione, with the winners of each sub-tournament meeting in the final. Subsequently, Serie D have staged their own competition, the Coppa Italia Serie D,  leaving only Eccellenza and Promozione teams to compete for the Coppa Italia Dilettanti.

Winners

Regional teams (Promozione)
1966–67 – Impruneta
1967–68 – STEFER (Rome)
1968–69 – ALMAS (Rome)
1969–70 – Ponte San Pietro
1970–71 – Montebelluna
1971–72 – Valdinievole
1972–73 – Jesolo
1973–74 – Miranese
1974–75 – Banco (Rome)
1975–76 – Soresinese
1976–77 – Casteggio
1977–78 – Sommacampagna
1978–79 – Ravanusa
1979–80 – Cittadella
1980–81 – Internapoli

National teams (Serie D) and regional ones (Promozione)

1981–82 – Leffe
1982–83 – Lodigiani
1983–84 – Montevarchi
1984–85 – Rosignano
1985–86 – Policassino
1986–87 – Avezzano
1987–88 – Altamura
1988–89 – Sestese
1989–90 – Breno
1990–91 – Savona
1991–92 – Quinzano
1992–93 – Treviso
1993–94 – Varese
1994–95 – Iperzola
1995–96 – Alcamo
1996–97 – Astrea
1997–98 – Larcianese
1998–99 – Casale

Regional teams (Eccellenza)

1999–2000 – Orlandina
2000–01 – Comprensorio Nola
2001–02 – Boys Caivanese
2002–03 – Ladispoli
2003–04 – Salò
2004–05 – Colognese
2005–06 – Esperia Viareggio
2006–07 – Pontevecchio
2007–08 – HinterReggio
2008–09 – Virtus Casarano
2009–10 – Tuttocuoio
2010–11 – Ancona 1905
2011–12 – Bisceglie
2012–13 – Fermana
2013–14 – Campobasso
2014–15 – Virtus Francavilla
2015–16 – Sanremese
2016–17 – Villabiagio
2017–18 – Sankt Georgen
2018–19 – Casarano
2019–20 Not awarded
2020–21 Not awarded
2021–22 – Barletta
2022–23 –

See also
 Football in Italy
 Eccellenza
 Promozione
 Coppa Italia Serie D

External links
 History of the competition at lnd.com 

7
Recurring sporting events established in 1966
1966 establishments in Italy